The Porsche 963 is an LMDh sports prototype racing car designed by Porsche and built by Multimatic, to compete in the Hypercar and GTP (Grand Touring Protoype) classes in the FIA World Endurance Championship and IMSA SportsCar Championship, respectively. The 963 name draws inspiration from the Porsche 956 and Porsche 962 that raced in the 1980s, which also competed in American and European racing series. The car was revealed at the 2022 Goodwood Festival of Speed, with a traditional red, white, and black livery.

The official race debut of the 963 was at the 2023 24 Hours of Daytona, the season-opening round of the 2023 IMSA SportsCar Championship. The car was originally slated for a non-competitive dress rehearsal at the 2022 8 Hours of Bahrain, however, Porsche decided later that they would not race at Bahrain in favour of more private testing time. Porsche later announced that the first customer 963s would not be delivered until April 2023 due to delays caused by supply chain disruptions, forcing customer teams to miss the opening races of the IMSA SportsCar Championship and WEC, something that the teams understood when engaging in talks with Porsche to take delivery.

Background
Porsche last competed in the FIA World Endurance Championship's top class, LMP1, back in 2017 with the Porsche 919 Hybrid, and in the IMSA SportsCar Championship (also partnered with Penske) with the Porsche RS Spyder in the LMP2 class, with the 919 taking outright championship victory in its final year of competition, and the RS Spyder taking outright championship victory in the American Le Mans Series and class championship victory in the European Le Mans Series. Following the withdrawal of Porsche's factory LMP1 and LMP2 teams from the World Endurance Championship and American Le Mans Series, Porsche maintained a presence in the lower classes with continued factory support for the 911 RSR in the American Le Mans Series' GT2 (later GTLM) class, and in the World Endurance Championship's GTE class. The Automobile Club de l'Ouest, the organiser of the 24 Hours of Le Mans, issued a statement regarding the matter, saying that the club "regrets this precipitous departure, as it does the abruptness of the decision from one of endurance racing’s most successful and lauded manufacturers".

As part of the LMDh regulations, interested parties can choose four constructors to partner with to construct the chassis upon to which design the car, those four constructors being Oreca, Ligier, Multimatic and Dallara. Head of Porsche Motorsport Pascal Zurlinden announced in March 2020 that Porsche would be evaluating an entry into LMDh, saying "Porsche is seriously looking into it, but there is no decision yet". This was followed up with an announcement in December that year that development of a LMDh project would commence, with Porsche being the first manufacturer to commit to the LMDh class. Multimatic was revealed in May 2021 to be the constructor that would supply the chassis for which Porsche would design bodywork, with Vice President of Porsche Motorsport Fritz Enzinger saying that "Multimatic is the most obvious and logical solution for us", and that "We have known this highly respected company and its team of experienced professionals for many years and are absolutely convinced of the quality of their work".

Testing commenced at the beginning of  2022, with the first tests being at Porsche's test track at Weissach, where the car's engine choice was also revealed, that being a twin-turbocharged V8, which is a development of the engine found in the Porsche 918 which in turn was developed from the  V8 found in the Porsche RS Spyder, paired with the standardised hybrid parts provided by Williams Advanced Engineering, Bosch, and Xtrac.

Porsche also announced in May 2022 that four 963s would be allocated to customers, at the cost of $2.9 million, with full factory support. JDC–Miller Motorsports and JOTA Sport both announced on the 25th of June that they would take delivery, with JDC MotorSport campaigning the 963 in the IMSA SportsCar Championship and JOTA fielding the car in the FIA World Endurance Championship.

Racing history 
Due to supply-chain constraints, Team Penske (the official factory-backed Porsche team) was the only team able to field the 963 at its debut at the 2023 24 Hours of Daytona. Customer teams JDC-Miller MotorSports and Proton Competition instead opted to run a Duqueine D-08 and Oreca 07, respectively.

The 963 made its first appearance in the practice sessions of the 2023 24 Hours of Daytona alongside fellow GTP debutants, the BMW M Hybrid V8, the Acura ARX-06, and the Cadillac V-LMDh. The 963 was often right behind the ARX-06s of Meyer Shank Racing and Wayne Taylor Racing, with the former leading all five practice sessions, bar the last one. A technical problem limited the mileage of the No. 6 963 to just nine laps in second practice, however, still managed to clock a time faster than the No. 31 Cadillac. Nick Tandy set the fastest time in a damp fifth free practice that saw intermittent rain, albeit none of the ARX-06s left their garages during the session. Tom Blomqvist took pole in what was a chaotic qualifying session; John Farano crashed at turn 7 in his Oreca 07, red flagging the session, later on another red flag was brought out for Tandy who crashed his 963. Given just a single flying lap after the session resumed following Tandy's accident, Blomqvist took pole with a 1:34.031, 0.083 s faster than Felipe Nasr in the No. 7 963. Blomqvist carried his pace into the race, leading the first 62 and last 97 laps. Both Porsches were beset by reliability issues, with significant time spent in the garages; the No. 7 was the first to come in, losing 35 laps to replace a faulty battery, Tandy in the No. 6 had been running in contention for overall victory in the morning until a gearbox failure ended his race.

Racing results

Complete IMSA SportsCar Championship results
(key) Races in bold indicates pole position. Races in italics indicates fastest lap.

*Season still in progress.

Complete World Endurance Championship results
(key) Races in bold indicates pole position. Races in italics indicates fastest lap.

* Season still in progress.

References

24 Hours of Le Mans race cars
Sports prototypes
Porsche racing cars
IMSA GTP cars
Cars introduced in 2022
Le Mans Daytona h cars
Hybrid electric cars
Team Penske